, formerly called Chanels, was a blackface Japanese male pop group that specialized in doo-wop-influenced music. The group was led by Masayuki Suzuki.

History
In 1975, Masayuki Suzuki, Masashi Tashiro and Nobuyoshi Kuwano, joined together to form a band called Chanels. The band debuted in 1980 with their first single "Runaway" selling over a million copies and becoming a huge hit. In 1983, the band changed its name to Rats & Star due to complaints from the French fashion giant Chanel. Andy Warhol created the album cover for Soul Vacation and the name change seemed to make no difference in sales, as their first single as Rats & Star, "Me-Gumi no Hito", sold over 800,000 copies. Five of the members were married at Tokyo's Hie Shrine at the same time during 1985, generating a lot of publicity for the group. Rats & Star released a duet with Masayuki's older sister Kiyomi Suzuki called "Lonely Chaplain" in 1986, which also became a huge hit. However, leader Masayuki Suzuki launched a solo career and Rats & Star's activity thus essentially stopped. Afterward, Tashiro and Kuwano remained popular not as musical artists, but as TV performers. They formed Rats & Star again in the limitation of half a year and released the single "Yume de Aetara" in 1996, which was popular enough to encourage the group to go on a final nationwide tour. The same year, they made their first appearance on Kōhaku Uta Gassen to perform that song.

The group's name is a palindrome, reading the same both backwards and forwards. The name's true meaning, however, is that "rats" raised in the less affluent parts of town could, by singing doo-wop music, reverse their fortunes and collectively become a "star".

In 2006, Suzuki, Kuwano and Sato formed "Gosperats" with Japanese a cappella singing group Gospellers' member Tetsuya Murakami and Yuji Sakai.

In 2015, Fuji TV canceled a Music Fair segment featuring Rats & Star and Momoiro Clover Z, after a photograph was circulated showing the groups in blackface.

Unique Andy Warhol screen prints of the album cover Soul Vacation have sold for upwards of $25,000 each.

Members
Masayuki Suzuki – Lead vocal, Martin
Masashi Tashiro – Tenor vocal, Marcy
Nobuyoshi Kuwano – Trumpet, Vocal, Kuwa-man
Yoshio Sato – Bass vocal
Hiroyuki Kuboki – Tenor vocal
Ryoichi Izumo – Guitar, Vocal
Kiyotaka Shinpo – Drums, Vocal

Discography

Chanels
Runaway (1980)
Tonight (1980)
Machikado Twilight (1981)
Hurricane (1981) (famously covered by Puffy AmiYumi)
Namida no Sweet Cherry (1981)
Hey Brother (1982) Epic/Sony
Akogare no Slender Girl (1982)
Summer Holiday (1982)
Moshikashite I LOVE YOU (1982)
Shuumatsu Dynamite (1982)

Rats and Star
Me-Gumi no Hito (1983)
T-shirt ni Kuchibiru (1983)
Konya wa Physical (1983)
Moonlight Honey (1984)
Glamour Guy (1984)
Kuchibiru ni Knife (1984)
Madonna wa Omae Dake (1985)
Lady Eccentric (1985)
Lonely Chaplain (1986) (duet with Kiyomi Suzuki)
Yume de Aetara (reunion, 1996)

References

Japanese pop music groups
Japanese vocal groups
Doo-wop groups
Musical groups from Tokyo